Smolensky, feminine: Smolenskaya, is a Russian-language toponymic surname literally meaning "from/of Smolensk". The corresponding Polish-language surnames are  Smoleński and  Smoleńska.

Notable people with this surname include:

 Alexander Smolensky (born 1954), Russian banker
 Nikolay Smolensky (born 1980), Russian banker
 Paul Smolensky (born 1955), American cognitive scientist
 Stepan Smolensky (1848–1909), Russian choir director

See also
 
 Smolenski
 Konstantinos Smolenskis, Greek military officer

Russian-language surnames